ONE Friday Fights 9: Eersel vs. Sinsamut 2 (also known as ONE Lumpinee 9) was a combat sports event produced by ONE Championship that took place on March 17, 2023, at Lumpinee Boxing Stadium in Bangkok, Thailand.

Background
A ONE Lightweight Muay Thai World Championship rematch between current champion Regian Eersel (also current ONE Lightweight Kickboxing Champion) and former title challenger Sinsamut Klinmee headlined the event. The pair previously fought at ONE on Prime Video 3 in October 2022, which Eersel won by split decision.

Results

Bonus awards 
The following fighters were awarded bonuses.

Performance of the Night ($50,000): Regian Eersel
Performance of the Night ($10,000): Muangthai P.K.Saenchai, Sam-A Gaiyanghadao, Sulaiman Looksuan, Saeksan Or. Kwanmuang, Silviu Vitez, Yodlekpet Or. Pitisak and Tagir Khalilov

See also 

 2023 in ONE Championship
 List of ONE Championship events
 List of current ONE fighters

References 

Events in Bangkok
ONE Championship events
2023 in mixed martial arts
Mixed martial arts in Thailand
Sports competitions in Thailand
March 2023 sports events in Thailand